C. Shane Reese is an American statistician and academic administrator. In 2019, he was appointed Academic Vice President of Brigham Young University (BYU) succeeding James Rasband, who had been called as a general authority seventy of the Church of Jesus Christ of Latter-day Saints. Reese previously had been dean of the College of Physical and Mathematical Sciences at BYU and the Melvin W. Carter professor in the statistics department.

Reese has bachelor's and master's degrees from BYU and a doctorate from Texas A&M University.

Reese has done studies using statistical models to predict what will happen to nuclear weapons. In 2013, Reese was made an association fellow of the American Statistical Association. Reese has also done solar storm mapping, whale activity mapping and many studies applying statistics to sports.

References

External links
 Profile of C. Shane Reese from Brigham Young University

Living people
American academic administrators
American statisticians
Brigham Young University alumni
Brigham Young University faculty
Texas A&M University alumni
Year of birth missing (living people)